Linda Kaplan Thaler (c. 1951) is an American advertiser and author. She is currently the CEO & President of Kaplan Thaler Productions. As an advertiser she helped create advertising campaigns that are well known in American culture including the Aflac duck and the “Yes, Yes, Yes” campaign for Clairol Herbal Essence. She has authored and composed jingles, including “I Don’t Wanna Grow Up, I’m a Toys "R" Us Kid,” and “Kodak Moments". She is a motivational speaker at businesses and colleges.

Education and career
Born to a Jewish family and raised in New York City, Kaplan Thaler graduated from The Bronx High School of Science in 1968. She studied at CCNY, earning a BS in psychology and later a Master of Music from the same institution. She is a member of the Phi Beta Kappa honors society.

Kaplan Thaler served as chairman of Publicis New York until 2016. Previously, she was CEO and Chief Creative Officer of the Kaplan Thaler Group, which she founded in 1997.

Prior to founding the Kaplan Thaler Group, she spent 17 years at J. Walter Thompson where she was a Senior Vice President, then went to Wells Rich Greene as Executive Vice President and Executive Creative Director. She has also worked on several political campaigns, including presidential runs for Bill Clinton and Al Gore in 1992 and Hillary Clinton in 2008, as well as Bill Bradley in 2000.

She is married to composer Fred Thaler.

Writing
Kaplan Thaler has co-authored four books with Robin Koval: Bang! Getting Your Message Heard in a Noisy World, The Power of Nice: How to Conquer the Business World with Kindness', The Power of Small: Why Little Things Make All the Difference and Grit to Great: How Perseverance, Passion and Pluck Take You from Ordinary to Extraordinary.

Television
Kaplan Thaler has appeared on The Apprentice, Good Morning America, TODAY, CNN and Fox News. She hosted the Oxygen television series, “Making It Big” and was a judge on the Mark Burnett reality series, “Jingles."

Achievements
In 2015, Kaplan Thaler was inducted into the American Advertising Hall of Fame. She is also the recipient of the 2016 Clio Lifetime Achievement Award.

Other awards include the New York Women in Communications Matrix Award, the Advertising Woman of the Year Award from Advertising Women of New York, the UJA's Mac Dane Humanitarian Award, the Women's Leadership Exchange's Compass Award and the Girl Scout's Woman of Distinction Award. Of her 13 Clio Awards, two were for Best Original Music and Lyrics. She was also the first woman in advertising to receive the New York Women in Film and Television's Muse Award. In 2010/2011, Kaplan Thaler served as the New York Women in Communications' President. She currently sits on the Advisory Council for The Colin Powell Center at CCNY and is a member of the advisory board for the Branding and Integrated Communications master's degree program at CCNY.

Publications
 
 
 
 Grit to Great: How Perseverance Passion and Pluck Take You from Ordinary to Extraordinary. Random House. 2015.

References

1951 births
Living people
20th-century American Jews
American business writers
Women business writers
American advertising executives
City College of New York alumni
People from the Bronx
Songwriters from New York (state)
The Bronx High School of Science alumni
Women in advertising
21st-century American Jews